Six60 are a New Zealand band.

Six60 may also refer to:

Six60 (2011 album), their debut studio album
Six60 (2015 album), their second studio album
 Six60 (2019 album), their third studio album

See also
 660